The National Umma Party is an Islamic political party in Sudan. It was formerly led by Sadiq al-Mahdi, who served twice as Prime Minister of Sudan, and was removed both times by military coups. , Major General Fadlallah Baramah Nasser was the acting Chair of the party, and al-Mahdi's daughter, Mariam al-Mahdi, was one of the three vice-chairs.

History

Foundation 
In August 1944, Sayyid Abd al-Rahman al-Mahdi, leader of the Ansar, met with senior Congress members and tribal leaders to discuss the formation of a pro-independence political party that was not associated with Mahdism. They launched a daily newspaper, al-Umma (The Community). In February 1945 the al-Umma party was organized and the party's first secretary, Abdullah Khalil, applied for a government license. The constitution made no mention of Abd al-Rahman or of the Ansar. The only visible link to Abd al-Rahman was the party's reliance on him for funding. However, rumors held that al-Umma had been created by the government and aimed to place Abd al-Rahman in power. These rumors persisted until June 1945, when the government publicly said it would not support a Mahdist monarchy.

During his premiership, Abdalla Khalil and several senior Umma officials instigated the 1958 Sudanese coup d'état, led by General Ibrahim Abboud.

Sadiq al-Mahdi was the prominent leader of the party through much of its history. Other historic members include Abdallah Bakr Mustafa.

Twenty-first century 
In 2002, 37 elected members split from the National Umma Party and formed the Umma Party (Reform and Renewal) (UPRR) led by Mubarak al Fadil al Mahdi, Sadiq al-Mahdi's first cousin. This party joined the ranks of the National Congress Party Government and stayed in power until Mubarak al-Fadil was dismissed from office. UPRR further split into four factions and later re-joined the National Umma Party.

All members of UPRR returned to the Umma National Party except for Mubarak al-Fadil due to allegations of conspiracy with South Sudan and for spreading slander and false information about colleagues in the National Umma Party and the opposition.

In 2010, the National Umma Party nominated Sadiq al-Mahdi as its presidential candidate in protest of 'electoral irregularities'. Mahdi placed fourth, and the party gained one assembly seat.

Factions 
The most prominent Umma faction was UPRR. Another faction of UPRR is led by Information Minister Alzahawi Ibrahim Maalik.

Another faction is Umma Party (Collective Leadership) (UPCL), led by Dr. al Sadiq al Hadi al Mahdi, who is the nephew of Mubarak al Fadil and first cousin of Sadiq al Mahdi. Dr. al Sadiq is the son of Imam al Hadi al Mahdi who led a faction of the Umma Party that al Mahdi's faction in the 1960s. Dr al Sadiq is an adviser to the President of Sudan. UPCL became part of the government and agreed to continue cooperation with Sudan's ruling National Congress Party in the mid-interim period after 2008.

The last faction is the Federal Umma Party, led by Ahmad Babiker Nahar, ex-Secretary General of UPRR who formed his party because he was wrongfully fired al Fadil. He became a member of Environment and Physical Development.

Sudanese Revolution
As a component of the National Consensus Forces (NCF) that signed Forces of Freedom and Change (FFC) charter on 1 January 2019, the Umma Party was integrated into the FFC alliance that coordinated the Sudanese Revolution and holds a strong constitutional role in the 39-month transitionary period to democracy.

On 4 November 2019, according to Sudan News Agency, one of the Umma Party vice-chairs, Mariam al-Mahdi (daughter of party leader Sadiq al-Mahdi), was nominated to the Central Council of the FFC as a representative of Sudan Call, while the NCF of which the Umma Party is a member, had five other representatives on the council.

Notes

References

External links 
 Umma Party (English and Arabic website)
 Sudan Electionnaire

Islamic political parties in Sudan
Political parties established in 1945
Sudanese nationalism